is a private university in Tama, Tokyo, Japan, established in 1989.

External links
 Official website

Educational institutions established in 1989
Private universities and colleges in Japan
Universities and colleges in Tokyo
Tama, Tokyo
1989 establishments in Japan